Soundair , previously Owen Sound Air Services, dba Soundair Express, was a freight airline based in Mississauga, Ontario, Canada. The airline was the parent company of Air Toronto and Odyssey International and operated freight flights under the brand Soundair Express.

History 
In 1973, Owen Sound Air Services was founded as a flying school and charter airline. Over the years, the airline grew by flying cargo for Purolator, Airborne Express, and Emery using Douglas DC-3s. In 1984, Soundair Corp. was created as a parent company. That same year, the airline acquired Aero Trades Western as well as its DC-3s and DC-4s.

In 1984, Soundair created two new airlines, Commuter Express and Odyssey International. Commuter Express was to provide local airline service to Toronto Pearson International Airport. In 1986, The DC-4s were replaced with Convair CV-580s and the DC-3s with Fokker F27 Friendships.

In 1988, Commuter Express became an Air Canada Connector and was renamed to Air Toronto. That same year, Odyssey International, a Toronto-based leisure airline, was founded and contracted cargo flights were rebranded as Soundair Express.

In 1990, the company entered receivership due to financial troubles. Odyssey and Soundair Express ceased operations in April 1990.

Fleet

Fleet as of receivership

Historic fleet

Subsidiary fleet

See also 
 List of defunct airlines of Canada

References 

Defunct airlines of Canada
Canadian companies disestablished in 1990
Canadian companies established in 1973
Airlines established in 1973
Airlines disestablished in 1990